The Newcastle and Suburban Co-operative Society, known locally as The Store, was a co-operative based in Newcastle, a city in New South Wales, Australia. The Store was described as "the largest and most successful co-operative society in the southern hemisphere". 

The co-operative was established in 1898, based on a co-operative tradition brought from Britain by immigrant coal miners. At its peak, the Store had 98,000 members and employed 1,450 workers in 15 retail stores and 11 service station "food courts". As well as food and retail goods, services included "[a] health fund, funeral fund, travel agency, credit union and a barber shop." The Newcastle Herald states that in 1942, the Store was "reputed to have the largest bakery in Australia, making about 62,800 loaves a week".

Increased shopper mobility and competition from suburban shopping centres saw the Store wind-up in 1981.

The Hunter Street Newcastle  building had remained in a prominent place on the bend, intersection on Hunter Street, being used for markets,supermarket, and stores, until in 2015 NSW Government purchased the Hunter Street Newcastle building. Doma Group  brought the building for $200 million. In 2021 it was demolished to make way for a new development.

See also
Rochdale Principles

References

External links
Newcastle and Suburban Co-operative Society archives – Hunter Living History
History of the Newcastle & Suburban Co-operative Society - Hunter Living History

History of Newcastle, New South Wales
Cooperatives in Australia
Organizations established in 1898
1981 disestablishments
Australian companies established in 1898